Alexsandro Carvalho Lopes or simply Alex Maranhão (born April 30, 1985) is a Brazilian football player who currently plays for Metropolitano.

He used to play for the Chinese club Nanchang Bayi in 2008.

He transferred to Portuguese Primeira Liga side S.C. Beira-Mar in July 2010.

Personal life 
Alex Maranhão's daughter Taina is also a footballer.

Honours 
 Criciúma
 Campeonato Catarinense: 2005

 Icasa
 Copa Integração: 2007

 Fortaleza
 Campeonato Cearense: 2009

References

Living people
1985 births
People from São Luís, Maranhão
Brazilian expatriate footballers
Brazilian footballers
Brazilian expatriate sportspeople in China
Expatriate footballers in China
Brazilian expatriate sportspeople in Portugal
Expatriate footballers in Portugal
Brazilian expatriate sportspeople in Egypt
Expatriate footballers in Egypt
Primeira Liga players
China League One players
Campeonato Brasileiro Série B players
Campeonato Brasileiro Série C players
Campeonato Brasileiro Série D players
Criciúma Esporte Clube players
Ceará Sporting Club players
Associação Desportiva Recreativa e Cultural Icasa players
Madureira Esporte Clube players
Ituano FC players
Shanghai Shenxin F.C. players
Esporte Clube Bahia players
Sertãozinho Futebol Clube players
Treze Futebol Clube players
S.C. Beira-Mar players
Grêmio Barueri Futebol players
Fortaleza Esporte Clube players
Ismaily SC players
Sampaio Corrêa Futebol Clube players
Association football midfielders
Sportspeople from Maranhão